István Gyurity (Croatian: Stipan Đurić; born February 27, 1970) is a Hungarian film and stage actor and folk music (starogradske pjesme) singer. He sings mostly traditional folk songs, these include Veselje ti navješćujem and Starogradski splet.

Đurić is the deputy of Hungarian Croat minority (Croatian minority self-government) in Hungary) in Budapest. He lives in Budapest.

Theatre
He is the stage actor of Croat Theatre of Pécs. He also performed in Croatia, in Croatian National Theatre in Osijek, and Theatre Joza Ivakić in Vinkovci and in Hungary, in Operette Theatre in Budapest.

Singing
As a singer he performed on Croatian national TV with Žiga i Bandisti (Glazbeni festival pjesme Podravine i Podravlja in Pitomača in 2009).

Movies
Đurić was an actor in several movies and TV Series. He appears as narrator in Hungarian documentaryVajdasági vérfürdő - 1944 (2004).

Selected filmography

Sources
 Hrvatski glasnik br.47/2005.
 Vijenac br.365 Trend vesele apokalipse, February 28, 2008
 Arcusfest 2009 2009. évi díjazottak
 Movie haven – szinkhronhangok Gyurity István
 Port.hu Gyurity István
 Pécsi Horvát Színház – Hrvatsko kazalište Pečuh Stipan Đurić

1970 births
Living people
Hungarian male film actors
Hungarian male television actors
Hungarian male stage actors
Croatian-language singers
Croats of Hungary
21st-century Hungarian male singers